The Nokia 7210 is a handset by Nokia, built on the Series 40 1st Edition software platform and enabled with J2ME (Java). The device features text and picture messaging, WAP browser, Stereo FM radio, Polyphonic ringtones, two preinstalled games and a 1.5", 128x128 pixel, 4,096 color display. It was the first Nokia phone for the mass market with a colour display and with polyphonic ringtones (they were already on the Nokia 3510 and Nokia 7650).

The 7210 featured an all-new front cover design, with a unique keypad layout incorporating a 4-way scroll button.  The phone came in a choice of colours, with changeable Xpress-on covers available. Eight colour schemes are available along with the ability to download images to save as wallpaper to add even more personalization.

Announced on 12 March 2002, it came to market in October 2002.

Features
Standard features for Nokia handsets at the time, the 7210 came with a speakerphone, mute, call conferencing, e-mail support, 300-name phone book, to-do list, calendar, calculator, currency converter, stopwatch, and an alarm clock. Nokia's PC Suite software for the 7210 allowed for wireless syncing of phone book, calendar, and to-do list via IR or an optional USB connectivity kit.

The Nokia 6610 was essentially the same phone feature-wise, but with a more conservative design aimed at business users, while the 7210 was aimed at fashion-conscious users.

Entertainment
The 7210 came installed with two games; Triple Pop and Bounce. Downloadable ring tones and images were available, until the limit of the phone's 725KB of memory was reached in addition to the 32 tones (plus vibrate) and 10 picture messages already on board. The phone was also J2ME compatible, meaning games and applications could be downloaded via GPRS. The 7210 had a built-in FM radio and also included in the box was an earboom headset. An alternative two-bud-style stereo version was available.

References

External links
 http://www.nokia.com/gb-en/support/product-archive/?action=productArchive&tid=1583274&searchTerm=Nokia+7210

Nokia smartphones
Mobile phones introduced in 2002
Mobile phones with infrared transmitter